The 1939 Colorado Buffaloes football team was an American football team that represented the University of Colorado as a member of the Mountain States Conference (MSC) during the 1939 college football season. Led by Bunny Oakes in his fifth and final season as head coach, the Buffaloes compiled an overall record of 5–3 with a mark of 5–1 in conference play, winning the MSC title.

Schedule

References

Colorado
Colorado Buffaloes football seasons
Mountain States Conference football champion seasons
Colorado Buffaloes football